Chantal Laboureur (born 4 January 1990 in Friedrichshafen) is a German beach volleyball player.

Professional career
Since 2021 her teammate has been Sarah Schulz.

World tour 2016

At the 2016 Grand Slam at Long Beach, California, 
In semi final action (Aug 27, 2016) Laboureur and Julia Sude lost to Kerri Walsh Jennings and April Ross of United States straight sets (21 - 17, 21 - 16).

Bronze medal match (Germany vs Germany) the pair won in straight sets (21-16, 21–17) against Katrin Holtwick and Ilka Semmler.

The pair competed at the Toronto World Tour finals in Sept. 2016  placing 1st in Pool D and advance to Quarter Finals.

References

External links
 
 
 

1990 births
Living people
German women's beach volleyball players
People from Friedrichshafen
Sportspeople from Tübingen (region)
Sportspeople from Stuttgart
Universiade medalists in beach volleyball
Universiade bronze medalists for Germany
Medalists at the 2013 Summer Universiade